The Macau Light Rapid Transit (MLRT, ; , MLM) is a mass transit system in Macau and is also the first railway system in Macau. The first phase of the project started construction in February 2012, and the first section of the Taipa line was opened to the public on 10 December 2019. Currently, the Macau Light Rapid Transit is operated by MTR (Macau), a wholly-owned subsidiary of MTR.   

Overall, the Taipa Line has been reported to have cost around 10 billion patacas. Once completed, the entire system is expected to serve the Macau Peninsula, Taipa and Cotai, serving major border checkpoints such as the Border Gate, the Outer Harbour Ferry Terminal, the Lotus Bridge border and the Macau International Airport. 

The system closed on 19 October 2021 for six months to replace all  of high voltage cables.

History

Conception 
The LRT was first proposed in 2002 by the Macau SAR Government in the Policy Address for the Fisical Year 2003 by then Chief Executive of Macau Edmund Ho as a method to "solve the urban transport issues". In the same year, the Macau SAR Government entrusted the Hong Kong Mass Transit Railway Corporation (Now MTR Corporation) to stage a preliminary study on a railway transport system. The system would mainly cater to tourists, expecting them to take 85% of the projected 43,000 daily rider ship, and was due to open in 2006.

The original proposal for the LRT was criticized by the public for being unable to handle the needs of Macau citizens, obstructing important views of the city, and also for being not cost-effective. Then Secretariat for Transport and Public Works Au Man Long decided to suspend plans for the LRT on 15 April 2003, citing the economic downturn caused by the severe acute respiratory syndrome outbreak at the time.

A second feasibility study was conducted in 2005 by the Mass Transit Railway Corporation, analysing possible routes for the LRT. The second study recommended a mixed underground and elevated system, with three separate lines: One peninsula encirclement line, one Macau-Taipa Line, and one Airport Line. Based on the second feasibility study and public opinion regarding it, the Macau SAR government in October 2006 released the Detailed Research Program for MLRT report that outlines a route for the LRT similar to the Phase I Line today. The Macau SAR Government, after considering the opinions of the public, called for the construction of the LRT in November 2007 after publishing their optimization program report months earlier. The optimization program report stated that the Mass Transit Railway Corporation, together with an international consortium, should be tasked with the construction of the LRT.

Construction 
In October 2009, the construction of the LRT was announced by the Macau SAR Government, with the goal of the LRT being operational by 2013. Several changes were made to the plan, including reducing the number of stations to 21 and building part of the LRT running along Nam Van Lake underground or at the surface level. However, due to the constant changes to the path of the LRT, as well as an appeal from one of the tender companies, the start date for construction was delayed for multiple times, and substantial work on the LRT did not commence until 2 February 2012.

In December 2010, the government announced that Mitsubishi Heavy Industries was chosen to provide the rolling stock and the system for the LRT, with a winning bid of 4.68 billion Macau Patacas. A contract would then be signed in March 2011, which would entail an order of 55 sets of 2-carriage rolling stock, as well as the accompanying communications and operating systems for the daily operation of the LRT.

The LRT improved transportation options between the Macau Peninsula, Taipa and Cotai, and relieve traffic congestion on roads and bridges. It is the first rapid transit system in Macau.

Site investigation work started in 2008, main construction work began on 21 February 2012 in Taipa, with the Taipa section operated by 10 December 2019 and Macau Peninsula section to be operating sometime by the early 2020s. Despite the official schedule, analysts did project the initial phase to not be in operation until 2017.

In January 2018, the Secretariat for Transport and Public Works Raimundo Arrais do Rosário stated that the Macau section of the LRT was "not top priority" and that priority would be given to the East line, which was formally presented on the same day.

Operation 
The Taipa line began operations on 10 December 2019 and initially offered free rides from its opening until 31 December, which was later extended to 31 January 2020.

In September 2020, preliminary plans for the East Line were released by the government for public consultation.

Construction of the Hengqin extension began on 18 March 2021.

The system closed on 19 October 2021 for six months to replace all  of high voltage cables.

Network

Operational line

Planned lines

The LRT is a driverless rubber-tyred system, similar to the Singapore LRT. The Phase I line will run along elevated guideways separate from road traffic.

The LRT will consist of at least two phases:

 Phase I Line (Macau–Taipa Line)Connecting major entry-exit points at the Macau Peninsula and the Taipa Island with residential and tourist areas. It will use reserved space in the lower deck of the Ponte de Sai Van (Sai Van Bridge) to connect to Taipa island. Only the Taipa and Cotai portions of this phase are currently in operation.
 Phase II Line (Loop Line)Connecting the Barrier gate to A-Ma Temple via the inner harbour area, eventually forming a loop on the Macau peninsula.

Rolling stock 

The LRT uses Mitsubishi Heavy Industries Crystal Mover APM vehicles with rubber tyres running on concrete tracks. Mitsubishi supplied 55 two-car trains that are fully automated (driverless) and utilize a rubber-tyred APM system. They have a capacity of up to 476 passengers. The car is named Ocean Cruiser.

The Macau government ordered 110 carriages in March 2011, and an additional 48 carriages in January 2014, for a total of 158 carriages in two batches. However, in May 2018, the Macau authorities cancelled the contract to purchase an additional 48 carriages from Mitsubishi Heavy Industries and were required to compensate 360 million patacas.

Construction 
The estimated construction cost for Phase 1 (with 21 stations) was revised in June 2011 from MOP 7.5 billion (about US$933 million) to MOP 11 billion (about US$1,370 million) including MOP 360 million for studies, MOP 4.9 billion for rolling stock and MOP 5.74 billion for construction. The project will be financed by the Government of Macau and is scheduled to take about 48 months to complete. Construction of the Taipa section of Phase 1 started in late February 2012.

Six design packages have been awarded, and the open tenders were expected to be published by October 2011, starting by the Taipa packages C250 and C260.

On 19 January 2015, the Third Special Audit Report on the First Phase of the Light Rail Transit System was published by the Commission of Audit, which indicated that the construction of the Macau Light Rail Transit was delayed by 883 days.

Power source 
To power up the operation of the LRT, CEM built two primary substations.

Stations

Taipa line 

The initial phase of Taipa Line has 11 stations with three planned extensions.
 Taipa–Barra extension
 Norte de Cotai extension
 Hengqin extension

Seac Pai Van line 

Seac Pai Van line will connect Taipa line with Seac Pai Van with an additional extension into Coloane.

Ponte HKMZ Shuttle line 
Ponte HKMZ Shuttle line will connect Península line, Leste line, & the HKZMB Checkpoint.

East line 
East line will connect the Península line with the Taipa line through Macau New Urban Zone A zone.

Península line 
The península line will serve the eastern Macau Peninsula with an additional extension along Porto Interior.

Pricing
Ticket prices are based on the number of stations a passenger travels through.
Those who pay with a stored-value LRT card will receive discounted fares.

Children below 1 m (3 ft 3 3⁄8 in) in height can travel for free. All prices are in MOP.

Network Map

See also 
 Transportation in Macau
 List of metro systems

References

External links 
 Report about Macau Light Transit System by Apple Daily, 20 October 2006.
 Transportation Infrastructure Office (GIT) Macao in charge of the LRT projects. 
 System map with station locations on aerial picture of the SAR 
 Third Special Audit Report on the First Phase of the Light Rail Transit System (in traditional Chinese, in simplified Chinese, and in Portuguese)

Light rail in Macau
Public transport in China
People mover systems in China
2019 establishments in China
2019 establishments in Macau
Railway lines opened in 2019
Urban people mover systems
Transport infrastructure in Macau